Sajjad is a given name and a surname. Notable people with the name include:

Given name
 Imam Sajjad (Ali ibn Husayn Zayn al-Abidin), 4th Imam of Shia Islam
 Syed Sajjad Haider Yaldram (1880–1943), Urdu short story writer, travel writer, translator, linguist, essayist, and humorist
 Sajjad Afghani, Kashmiri militant and Commander-in-Chief of Harkat Ul Ansar
 Sajjad Akbar (born 1961), Pakistani cricketer
 Sajjad Ali, Pakistani semi-classical, pop singer, film actor, director and producer
 Sajjad Anoushiravani (born 1984), Iranian weightlifter
 Sajjad Fazel (born 1991), Tanzanian clinical pharmacist, public health researcher, health columnist
 Sajjad Ganjzadeh (born 1992), Iranian karateka
 Sajjad Gul, Pakistani film producer, media mogul
 Sajjad Hussain (cricketer, born 1980), Indian cricketer
 Sajjad Hussain (cricketer, born 1986), Pakistani cricketer
 Sajjad Hussain (composer), Indian music director
 Sajjad Karim, British Asian politician
 Sajjad Gharibi (born 1991), Iranian bodybuilder
 Sajjad Ghani Lone (born 1967), Indian Kashmiri politician, and former Member of the Legislative Assembly
 Sajjad Mardani (born 1988), Iranian taekwondo player
 Sajjad Haider Nadeem, Pakistani politician, member of the Provincial Assembly of the Punjab
 Sajjad Hussain Qureshi (1923–1998), politician, Governor of Punjab 1985-1988
 Sajjad Shar (born 1986), Secretary General of banned organization Jeay Sindh Muttahida Mahaz
 Sajjad Zaheer, Urdu writer, Marxist thinker and revolutionary

Middle name
 Aasim Sajjad Akhtar, Pakistani professor, politician and columnist
 Aamer Sajjad (born 1981), Pakistani cricketer
 Razia Sajjad Zaheer (1918–1979), Indian writer in the Urdu language, translator

Surname
 Enver Sajjad (1935–2019), Pakistani playwright and fiction writer
 Pervez Sajjad, Pakistani cricketer
 Wasim Sajjad, Pakistani lawyer, former President of Pakistan

Arabic-language surnames
Arabic masculine given names
Pakistani masculine given names